Matías Sánchez (born 18 November 1979) is an Argentine former professional footballer who played as a forward.

Career
Sánchez spent the first years of his senior career with Cambaceres in Primera C Metropolitana, playing twenty-seven times and scoring once between 1996 and 1999. The club won promotion in 1998–99 to Primera B Metropolitana. He had two spells with Cambaceres in the division, either side of a short spell with fellow Primera B Metropolitana side Temperley with whom he scored five goals in thirty professional matches for. In 2004, Sánchez left Cambaceres after over one hundred appearances to join La Plata of Torneo Argentino B. After La Plata, Sánchez had spells with Argentino, Villa San Carlos, Dock Sud and Cañuelas.

After two years without a team, Sánchez signed for Sportivo Italiano of Primera B Nacional in 2010. He played just once for the club, versus CAI on 6 February, before departing. He ended his career with appearances for Tristán Suárez and General Lamadrid.

Honours
Cambaceres
Primera C Metropolitana: 1998–99

References

External links

1979 births
Living people
Footballers from La Plata
Argentine footballers
Association football forwards
Primera C Metropolitana players
Primera B Metropolitana players
Torneo Argentino B players
Primera Nacional players
Defensores de Cambaceres footballers
Club Atlético Temperley footballers
La Plata FC footballers
Argentino de Quilmes players
Club Atlético Villa San Carlos footballers
Sportivo Dock Sud players
Cañuelas footballers
Sportivo Italiano footballers
CSyD Tristán Suárez footballers
General Lamadrid footballers